Youyi Road station may refer to:

 Youyi Road station (Changsha Metro), a station in Hunan, China
 Youyi Road station (Shanghai Metro), a station on the Shanghai Metro in Shanghai
 Youyi Road station (Wuhan Metro), a station on the Wuhan Metro in Hubei, China